Galactan endo-beta-1,3-galactanase (endo-beta-1,3-galactanase) is an enzyme with systematic name arabinogalactan 3-beta-D-galactanohydrolase. This enzyme catalyses the following chemical reaction

 The enzyme specifically hydrolyses beta-1,3-galactan and beta-1,3-galactooligosaccharides

The enzyme from the fungus Flammulina velutipes (winter mushroom) hydrolyses the beta(1->3) bonds found in type II plant arabinogalactans.

References

External links 
 

EC 3.2.1